{{Speciesbox
|image = Hebe pauciramosa - Botanischer Garten, Dresden, Germany - DSC08400.JPG
|genus = Veronica
|parent = Veronica sect. Hebe
|species = pauciramosa
|authority = (Cockayne & Allan) Garn.-Jones
|synonyms =
Hebe pauciramosa (Cockayne & Allan) L.B.Moore
Leonohebe pauciramosa (Cockayne & Allan) Heads
|synonyms_ref = 
}}Veronica pauciramosa, synonym Hebe pauciramosa, is a species of plant in the family Plantaginaceae, endemic to the South Island of New Zealand, where it grows in mountains. It is an upright, evergreen shrub about 16 in (40 cm) tall, with green, spear-shaped leaves 0.2 in (6 mm) long, and white flowers.Hebe pauciramosa var. masoniae L.B.Moore is now treated as a separate species, Veronica masoniae''.

References

 Tropicos entry
 Hebe Society entry

pauciramosa
Endemic flora of New Zealand